Brandl is a surname of German origin. People with that surname include:
 David Brandl (born 1987), Austrian swimmer
 Johann Brandl (1835–1913), Austrian composer
 Johann Evangelist Brandl (1760–1837), German composer
 John Brandl (19372008), American economist, state legislator and academic administrator
 Mark Staff Brandl (born 1955), American artist, art historian and art critic
 Maximilian Brandl (born 1997), German mountain bike racer
 Nadine Brandl (born 1990), Austrian synchronized swimmer
 Petr Brandl (16681735), Bohemian painter
 Reinhard Brandl (born 1977), German politician
 Therese Brandl (190248), German Nazi concentration camp guard executed for war crimes.
 Uwe Brandl (born 1959), German politician
 George Thomas Brandl (born 1973), American executive.

See also 
 Georg Brandl Egloff (born 1963), American composer and performer of music for film, television, radio and commercials